Abi Sampa is a singer from London in the Indian classical tradition.  She appeared in The Voice UK (series 2) in 2013.   She sings Qawwali, Carnatic music and Western music.  She was the first singer from an Asian tradition to appear on the show.

She qualified as a dentist in 2011, and continues to practice dental work in London after her rise to fame on The Voice.

She accompanies herself on the Veena and other Asian instruments, generally with other musicians.

She supported Bryan Adams's tour of India in Ahmedabad in 2018 and was involved in the remake of We Are the World in 2018.

References

Musicians from London
Living people
21st-century British women singers
Year of birth missing (living people)
The Voice UK contestants